The Motukawao Islands are the northernmost of several small groups of islands that lie in the Hauraki Gulf off the west coast of the Coromandel Peninsula, New Zealand. The largest of the islands are Motuwi and Ngamotukaraka Islands; others include Moturua and Motukaramarama Islands.

It has been identified as an Important Bird Area by BirdLife International because it is a nesting site for about 3500 pairs of Australasian gannets.

See also

 List of islands of New Zealand
 List of islands
 Desert island

References

Uninhabited islands of New Zealand
Thames-Coromandel District
Islands of the Hauraki Gulf
Islands of Waikato